Maine Prairie is an unincorporated community located in Solano County, California east of Elmira, California on the Maine Prairie Slough at latitude 38.308 and longitude -121.759. Maine Prairie appears on the Dozier U.S. Geological Survey Map.

During the American Civil War, it was a township large enough to support a California Militia Company (the Maine Prairie Rifles) from Sept. 19, 1863 to  June 23, 1868.  The township appears on an 1890 map of Solano County.

References 

  J. P. Munro-Fraser, History of Solano County...and histories of its cities,  towns...etc., Wood, Alley & Co., East Oakland, 1879. pp. 306-310. Maine Prairie

External links
  County Maps - SOLANO COUNTY CALIFORNIA (CA/VACAVILLE) MAP 1877 Shows Original Townships of: Silveyville, Green Valley, Tremont, Vallejo, Benicia, Vacaville, Elmira, Maine Prairie, Denverton, Rio Vista, Suisun, Montezuma, Mount Markley, Potrero Hills, California and Pacific Railroad, Vaca Valley Railroad, Pleasant Valley, Lagoon Valley, Wooden Valley, Sweeny Creek & Prospect Slough.
  Maine Prairie Map — Satellite Images of Maine Prairie

Unincorporated communities in Solano County, California
Unincorporated communities in California